The Gran Premio d'Italia is a Listed flat horse race in Italy open to three-year-old thoroughbreds. It is run at Milan over a distance of 2,400 metres (about 1½ miles), and it is scheduled to take place each year in June.

History
The event was established in 1921, and it was initially contested over 1,800 metres. It was run over 2,000 metres in 1926 and 1927, and extended to 2,400 metres in 1928.

The present system of race grading was introduced in the early 1970s, and for a period the Gran Premio d'Italia was classed at Group 1 level. During the late 1980s and early 1990s it took place in September.

The race was downgraded in 1996, and cut to 2,000 metres in 1997. From this point it held Listed status and was staged in June or July, although the IFHA website wrongly gives it a Group 2 status.

The Gran Premio d'Italia was run over 2,200 metres in 2009. It was increased to 2,400 metres in 2010.

Records
Leading jockey since 1984 (3 wins):
 Fernando Jovine – Jaunty Jack (1997), Clapham Common (1998), Endless Hall (1999)
 Mirco Demuro – Sopran Glaumix (2001), Primary (2006), Rastignano (2008)
 Dario Vargiu - Fisich (2002), Bertinoro (2014), Chestnut Honey (2019)

Leading trainer since 1984 (9 wins):
 Stefano Botti – Apprimus (2009), Kidnapping (2010), Bacchelli (2011), Wild Wolf (2012), Bertinoro (2014), Time Chant (2015), Full Drago (2016), Aethos (2017), Henry Mouth (2018)

Leading owner since 1984 (3 wins):
 Dioscuri SRL - Bertinoro (2014), Full Drago (2016), Henry Mouth (2018)

Winners since 1984

Earlier winners

 1921: Michelangelo
 1922: Fiorello
 1923: Duccia di Buoninsegna
 1924: Giambologna
 1925: Lui
 1926: Cranach
 1927: Varedo
 1928: Delleana
 1929: Ortello
 1930: Sciacca
 1931: Salpiglossis
 1932: Velite
 1933: Pilade
 1934: Navarro
 1935: Jacopo da Pontormo
 1936: Archidamia / Ettore Tito *
 1937: Donatello
 1938: Nearco
 1939: Maenio
 1940: Moroni
 1941: Niccolo dell'Arca
 1942: Scire
 1943: Orsenigo
 1944: Torbido
 1945: Traghetto
 1946: Gladiolo
 1947: Tenerani
 1948: Trevisana
 1949: Golfo
 1950: Fiorillo
 1951: Nuccio
 1952: Iroquois
 1953: Toulouse Lautrec
 1954: Botticelli
 1955: Theodorica
 1956: Tissot
 1957: Braque
 1958: Sedan
 1959: Exar
 1960: Marguerite Vernaut
 1961: Nuria
 1962: Antelami
 1963: Osmarin
 1964: Maxim
 1965: Accrale
 1966: Serov
 1967: Ruysdael
 1968: Teston
 1969: Bonconte di Montefeltro
 1970: Ortis
 1971: Weimar
 1972: Tierceron
 1973: Prince Ippi
 1974: Ribecourt
 1975: Laomedonte
 1976: Art Style / Red Arrow *
 1977: Wale
 1978: Sortingo
 1979: Maria Waleska
 1980: Pareo
 1981: Kirtling
 1982: Oui Mon Capitaine
 1983: Celio Rufo

* The 1936 and 1976 races were dead-heats and have joint winners.

See also
 List of Italian flat horse races

References

 Racing Post / www.labronica.it:
 , 
 galopp-sieger.de – Gran Premio d'Italia.
 pedigreequery.com – Gran Premio d'Italia – Milano San Siro.

Flat horse races for three-year-olds
Horse races in Italy
Recurring sporting events established in 1921
1921 establishments in Italy
Sport in Milan